Tere Naal Love Ho Gaya is a 2012 Indian Hindi-language romantic comedy film directed by Mandeep Kumar and produced by Kumar S. Taurani. The film features the real-life couple Riteish Deshmukh and Genelia D'Souza in lead roles. Diljit Dosanjh and Veena Malik appeared in guest roles. The film is inspired by the 1997 film A Life Less Ordinary.

Tere Naal Love Ho Gaya is jointly produced by Tips Industries and UTV Motion Pictures. It was based on Punjabi and Haryanavi culture. The film was released on 24 February 2012. It received positive response from critics and was declared a hit by Box Office India. The film was remade in Telugu in 2014 as Ra Ra... Krishnayya.

Plot
Mini is a young woman who lives off her father Bhatti's money and wealth. She hates the term "marriage." However, she is still being forced to get married by her father to Sunny, a man from a wealthy family who just wants access to Mini's Canadian Green Card. Viren is a hard-working simpleton who dreams of having his own travel agency with a fleet of cars for which he is painstakingly saving money. He works as a rickshaw driver for Bhatti and keeps his savings under the seat of his rickshaw. Bhatti sells off all his rickshaws one day – with Viren's savings of Rs. 60,000 in one of them – and buys a new fleet of cars. Viren gets drunk to drown his sorrows over his lost money; in a drunken stupor, he ends up at Bhatti's doorstep demanding his money back, while Mini's engagement to Sunny is in progress. An argument ensues and Viren lays his hands on a pistol. Viren tells Bhatti that he is going to count to three or he is going to shoot him. Viren counts to three but misses because he was drunk.

Amidst the ensuing commotion, Mini seizes the opportunity of cancelling her marriage and forces Viren to kidnap her, making him drive them off in one of her father's new taxis. The spunky Mini makes a deal with Viren that he will follow her instructions and will demand a ransom of Rs 1 million (10 lakh rupees) from her father. He can then have his Rs 60,000 that he lost and she will keep the rest as she does not want to go back home and get married. While the ransom letter is on the way to Bhatti, the couple enter into someone's empty home and try to make ends meet; in the process, they fall in love and are happy being with each other. The story takes a twist when Sunny and Bhatti come to pay the ransom money but fool them and start firing, hoping to take Mini back. Suddenly, Mini and Viren are kidnapped by another person and taken away to the house of Chowdhary, a notorious kidnapping kingpin.

Chowdhary makes a living out of demanding ransom, and it is then revealed that Viren (alias "Chotu") is Chowdhary's son: disapproving of his father's ways, Viren left home six years ago to work in Patiala as a rickshaw driver. Bhatti comes to pay the ransom and take her home, much to the dismay of Mini, as she loves Viren and does not want to marry Sunny. Viren's family, having grown fond of her, wants him to marry Mini. When Chowdhary tells him that Mini will run the family kidnapping business when he is gone, however, Viren realises he cannot allow Mini to lead such a dishonorable life and rejects the proposal. Mini assumes Viren does not love her, and leaves with a broken heart. Viren has a conversation with Chowdhary, who decides to forgo his kidnapping business for the sake of his family, and decides to go after Mini. Back home, Mini goes through with the wedding ceremony as per Bhatti's wishes, believing that the man with her is Sunny, but it turns out to have been Viren all along. The two drive off back to Chowdhary's house where they turn the kidnapping business into a reputable taxi driving one.

Cast
 Riteish Deshmukh as Viren Chaudhary 
 Genelia D'Souza as Mini Chaudhary 
 Om Puri as Mr. Chaudhary
 Tinnu Anand as Bhatti
 Smita Jaykar as Viren's mother
 Chitrashi Rawat as Dhani
 Navin Prabhakar as Naidu
 Atif Aslam in a special appearance in song "Tu Mohabbat Hai"
 Diljit Dosanjh in a special appearance in song "Pee Pa Pee Pa"
 Veena Malik in a special appearance in song "Fann Ban Gayi"
 Kartar Cheema as Sunny (Mini's fiancé)
 Gurmeet Saajan as Chaudhary's brother
 Satwant Kaur

Soundtrack

The soundtrack is composed by duo Sachin–Jigar and released on 23 January 2012. The album received positive response from critics.

Track list

Reception

Critical response
The film received positive reviews from critics and audiences alike. The chemistry of the lead cast was praised. Taran Adarsh from Bollywood Hungama rated the film 3 out of 5, and added "Tere Naal Love Ho Gaya is a sweet love story which is entertaining enough to succeed critically and commercially." Times of India gave a positive review and said "With the feel-good factor working to its advantage, you might just end up saying Tere Naal Love Ho Gaya to this sweet-n-simple film." Daily News and Analysis gave 3 stars out of 5, commented "The director seems to know well the culture of Punjab and Haryana and has generously incorporated it, including the way, Genelia's fiancé brags about his money power. Filmi at times, it doesn't fail to make you smile. Fun watch with your family."

Well-known critic Komal Nahta from Koimoi gave it 2.5/5, mentioning that "The film is entertaining, however an edgy climax ruins the show. The film to not be unique or new." Preeti Arora from Rediff gave the movie 2.5/5, and pointed out the flaws in dialogues by Dhieyo Sandhu, even mentioning too many inane, trite, one-liners. NDTV movie reviews gave 2.5 stars out of 5, mentioning that "No extraordinary story or no unique formula, no major histrionics, yet, this romantic-comedy entertains and touches your heart."

Box office
Tere Naal Love Ho Gaya opened to a good response with an occupancy of around 70% to 100% on the opening day and collected 62 million nett. The film saw a major improvement grossing 200 million nett over its first weekend. Tere Naal Love Ho Gaya held up well, collecting 201 million in its first week and grossing 125.0 million nett over its second weekend taking the total 10-day collections to around 367.7 million net.

Awards and nominations

References

External links

2012 films
2012 romantic comedy-drama films
2010s Hindi-language films
Films set in Haryana
UTV Motion Pictures films
Indian romantic comedy-drama films
Indian remakes of British films
Hindi films remade in other languages